Patrick Russell may refer to:

 Patrick Russell (bishop) (1629–1692), Irish Roman Catholic archbishop of Dublin
 Patrick Russell (herpetologist) (1726–1805), Scottish surgeon and naturalist who worked in India
 Sir Patrick Russell (judge) (1926–2002), English High Court judge and a member of the Privy Council
 Patrick Russell (ice hockey) (born 1993), Danish ice hockey forward